Uthman Suleiman al-Megrahi is a former member of the Libyan National Transitional Council representing the city of Batnan.

References

Living people
Members of the National Transitional Council
Year of birth missing (living people)